Cheick Tidiane Diabaté (born 25 April 1988) is a Malian professional footballer who plays as a forward for Persepolis in the Persian Gulf Pro League. From 2005 to 2016, he represented the Mali national team internationally.

Club career

Bordeaux
Diabaté was promoted to the senior squad of Girondins de Bordeaux for the 2008–09 season following a successful season in the CFA, where he made 35 appearances and scored 18 goals. As Bordeaux preferred to field more experienced strikers, manager Laurent Blanc loaned Diabaté out to the Corsica-based and Ligue 2 club AC Ajaccio to enable him to get more playing time.

Ajaccio (loan)
Diabaté made his debut for AC Ajaccio in their opening match of the 2008–09 Ligue 2 season, in a loss to Châteauroux, playing the full 90 minutes. In the second match, he scored a brace in their 3–1 away win over Stade de Reims. Three weeks later, he scored another brace, this time in a 4–0 home thrashing of Vannes. He scored one goal in each of the following three Ligue 2 matches with Ajaccio earning wins over Brest and Clermont and drawing with Nîmes.

Diabaté's positive play continued throughout the season scoring important match-winning goals in Ligue 2 matches against Guingamp, Lens, Angers, and Boulogne. He also scored a goal in the Derby Corse against SC Bastia, in a 1–1 home Ligue 2 draw. Diabaté finished the season with 14 Ligue 2 goals, which made him the club's top scorer and placed him 4th among the top Ligue 2 scorers of the season; Ajaccio managed to stave off relegation only on the final day of the season.

While on loan to AC Ajaccio, Diabaté had his contract with Bordeaux extended until June 2013.

Nancy (loan)
Diabaté returned to Bordeaux on 1 July 2009. On 20 July, he was loaned out again, this time to fellow Ligue 1 club AS Nancy. The striker spent most of the season playing for the reserve team, playing only three matches (two matches in Ligue 1 and one match in the Coupe de la Ligue) for the first team.

Return to Bordeaux
Diabaté scored two goals in the final of the 2013 Coupe de France to help Bordeaux defeat Evian TG 3–2.

Diabaté had an excellent 2013–14 Ligue 1 season with Bordeaux, registering 12 goals in 25 Ligue 1 matches and scoring in a 1–1 away draw against Toulouse FC, one goal in each of the two rounds of matches against FC Lorient, and a second-half brace in a 4–1 home win against FC Sochaux-Montbéliard.

Osmanlıspor
On 27 May 2016, Diabaté joined Osmanlıspor on a three-year contract. Having returned from his loan to Metz in the summer, it was reported in mid-August 2017 that he had agreed to the termination of his contract.

Metz (loan)
On 30 December 2016, the Süper Lig club Osmanlıspor announced that Diabaté had been loaned to Ligue 1 club Metz until the end of the 2016–17 season, with Metz having an option to purchase him. Diabaté helped Metz avoid relegation scoring eight goals in 14 matches and the club expressed interest in signing him permanently in June 2017.

Benevento (loan)
In January 2018, Diabaté joined Serie A side Benevento on loan for the rest of the 2017–18 season. He scored his first goal in his first match for the Campanian team in a 3–2 win against Crotone. Diabate also scored two goals a piece against Hellas Verona, Juventus, and Sassuolo. His goal scoring form was such that with six goals in three games he equaled a long-standing Serie A record held since 2001 by Dario Hubner. He finished the season with eight goals in 11 games, having the best goal ratio among the players with more than one appearance in Serie A in 2010s, ahead of likes of Edinson Cavani, Romelu Lukaku, Cristiano Ronaldo and Zlatan Ibrahimović.

Emirates Club
On 18 September 2018, Diabaté joined Emirates Club on a one-year contract.

Esteghlal

On 9 July 2019, Diabaté signed for Iranian club Esteghlal on a two-year contract. He was handed the number 7 shirt. He debuted for the club on 23 August, coming on as 67th-minute substitute for Farshid Esmaeili in a league match against Machine Sazi. Six days later, he made his first start in his first appearance at Azadi Stadium in a 1–1 draw against Foolad. On 1 November, he scored his first goals for Esteghlal, netting a hat-trick in a 4–2 away win against Tractor. He scored a brace in his AFC Champions League debut against Kuwait SC in a 3–0 victory. He ended the season with a tally of 18 goals in all competitions of which his 13 goals in the league made him the top scorer for that season.

Al-Gharafa 
On 17 September 2021, Diabaté joined Qatari club Al-Gharafa.

Persepolis 
On 2 September 2022, Diabaté joined Persian Gulf Pro League side Persepolis on a one-year deal. He received the squad number 25 shirt. Diabaté debuted for the club on 13 October, coming on as 85th-minute substitute for Jürgen Locadia in a league match against Mes Rafsanjan.

International career
Diabaté started out with Mali's national under-17 team where they participated in the 2005 African U-17 Championship. He scored a goal in each of their group stage matches but Mali failed to advance to the knock-out stage. Less than a month after that tournament, he made his senior debut against Liberia in a 2006 World Cup qualifier 5 June 2005, coming on as an 85th-minute substitute for Dramane Coulibaly; Mali won the match 4–1. Diabaté was a member of the Mali side that earned third place at the 2012 Africa Cup of Nations. He finished the tournament as one of the top scorers, having netted three goals in total, including two in the third place play-off against Ghana on 11 February 2012, which Mali won 2–0.

Career statistics

Club

International
Scores and results list Mali's goal tally first, score column indicates score after each Diabaté goal.

Honours
Bordeaux
Coupe de France: 2012–13

Esteghlal
Hazfi Cup runner-up: 2019–20,  2020–21

Mali
Africa Cup of Nations third Place: 2012, 2013

Individual
Africa Cup of Nations top scorer: 2012 (three goals)
Coupe de France top scorer: 2012–13 (six goals)
Persian Gulf Pro League top scorer: 2019–20 (15 goals)

References

External links

1988 births
Living people
Sportspeople from Bamako
Malian footballers
Association football forwards
Mali international footballers
Mali youth international footballers
2012 Africa Cup of Nations players
2013 Africa Cup of Nations players
JS Centre Salif Keita players
FC Girondins de Bordeaux players
AC Ajaccio players
AS Nancy Lorraine players
Ankaraspor footballers
FC Metz players
Benevento Calcio players
Emirates Club players
Esteghlal F.C. players
Al-Gharafa SC players
Ligue 1 players
Ligue 2 players
Süper Lig players
Serie A players
UAE Pro League players
Persian Gulf Pro League players
Qatar Stars League players
Malian expatriate footballers
Malian expatriate sportspeople in France
Expatriate footballers in France
Malian expatriate sportspeople in Turkey
Expatriate footballers in Turkey
Malian expatriate sportspeople in Italy
Expatriate footballers in Italy
Malian expatriate sportspeople in the United Arab Emirates
Expatriate footballers in the United Arab Emirates
Malian expatriate sportspeople in Iran
Expatriate footballers in Iran
Malian expatriate sportspeople in Qatar
Expatriate footballers in Qatar
21st-century Malian people
Persepolis F.C. players